Emmanuelle 6: One Final Fling (DVD title: Emmanuelle in Space 6: One Last Fling) is a 1994 television movie from the Emmanuelle in Space series featuring several softcore sex scenes mostly between Krista Allen and co-star Paul Michael Robinson. It was directed by Jean-Jacques Lamore, produced by Alain Siritzky, and written by J.C. Knowlton, based on character by Emmanuelle Arsan. The cinematographic was by Andrea V. Rossotto.

Cast
 Krista Allen as Emmanuelle
 Paul Michael Robinson as Captain Haffron Williams
 Tiendra Demian
 Jennifer Burton
 Kimberly Rowe
 Timothy Di Pri
 Brad Nick'ell
 Debra K. Beatty
 Lori Morrissey
 Holly Hollywood
 Reginald Chevalier
 Priscilla Choi

References

External links
 
 

American television films
1994 television films
1994 films
Emmanuelle in Space
1990s French films